Corso Vollenhove
The Corso is the annual flower parade in Vollenhove. It is one of the largest parades in the Netherlands which traditionally takes place on the last Saturday of August.

The parade is a local highlight for the region. Many months before the actual parade residents are busy preparing the parade floats (which are often several metres high). The parade attracts thousands of interested people every year. Although Dahlia flowers are the main theme of the parade alternative materials such as cabbage leaves and birdseed are also used. . The number of dahlias ranges from 100,000 to 250,000 pieces per float.

Bloemencorso
Bloemencorso (a Dutch word) means "flower parade", "flower pageant" or "flower procession". In a parade of this kind the floats (praalwagens) and cars are magnificently decorated or covered in flowers. Each parade has its own character, charm and theme. Many towns and regions in the Netherlands and Belgium hold parades every year.
It is very similar the annual Jersey Battle of Flowers on Jersey

Parade float construction
The floats are built by different groups. Throughout the years, several groups have been added. But many groups have stopped here a list of float construction groups Vollenhove currently still building: Fulnaho, Venomenaal,  Excellent, Klein Cuba, Nameless, Rataplan, Twee Nijenhuizen, De Vereniging,  Stark Wark, 't Jakan, Fatal Attraction, Geniaal.

Dahlia Queen
For over twenty years in the week preceding the parade, there is an election for Dahlia Queen (and more recently: Princess Dahlia). She acts as hostess, awards, give interviews and opens the parade of floats and parade bands on the last Saturday of August.

Every lady of sixteen years and older is eligible for the honorary position and can apply at the Vollenhoofse Association for public entertainment (vvvv). Although there are some selection rules which the candidates are assessed during the show, such as charm, spontaneity and a smooth talk.

See also

 Bloemencorso Bollenstreek
 Bloemencorso Zundert

Steenwijkerland
Parades in the Netherlands
Annual events in the Netherlands
Tourist attractions in Overijssel
Flower festivals in the Netherlands
Summer events in the Netherlands